Crease may refer to:

 A line (geometry) or mark made by folding or doubling any pliable substance
 Crease (band), American hard rock band that formed in Ft. Lauderdale, Florida in 1994
 Crease pattern, origami diagram type that consists of all or most of the creases in the final model
 Crease Range, mountain range in northernwestern British Columbia, Canada
 Skin crease, areas of skin where it folds

People
 Crease (surname)

Sports
 Crease (cricket), area demarcated by white lines painted or chalked on the field of play
 Crease (hockey), volume of space in an ice rink directly in front of the goalie net, indicated by painted red lines on the rink surface
 Crease, in lacrosse, white circle around the orange net, where only the goalie and defense may step into

See also